Marjetica Potrč (pronounced ; born 1953) is an artist and architect based in Ljubljana, Slovenia. Potrč's interdisciplinary practice includes on-site projects, research, architectural case studies, and series of drawings. Her work documents and interprets contemporary architectural practices (in particular, with regard to energy infrastructure and water use) and the ways people live together.

Background and early career
Her parents were both writers. Potrč's father, Ivan Potrč, was a well-known Slovene social realist novelist and playwright from the Styria region, and the main editor at the publishing house Mladinska Knjiga. Her mother, Branka Jurca, was a teacher and magazine editor and also a well-known author of children's literature, who was born in the Karst region of western Slovenia but moved to Maribor, where she met Marjetica's father.

Marjetica Potrč received degrees in architecture (1978) and sculpture (1986, 1988) from the University of Ljubljana. In 1990, she moved to the United States. Her installations from this period often involved walls of various kinds; for example, Two Faces of Utopia (1993, made for the Slovene Pavilion at the Venice Biennial), and the series Theatrum Mundi: Territories (1993–1996). A statement she made at the time—"I don't make objects. I build walls"—positions her work against object-based sculpture. In 1994, she moved back to Ljubljana. Since then, Potrč's work has developed at the intersection of visual art, architecture, and social science.

Participatory design and sustainable solutions

In 2003, Potrč was invited to spend six months in Caracas, Venezuela, as part of the Caracas Case Project, and carry out research on the informal city. There, in collaboration with the Israeli architect Liyat Esakov and the residents of the La Vega barrio, she developed the project Dry Toilet: an ecologically safe, waterless toilet was installed in the upper part of the La Vega barrio, a district in Caracas that has no access to the municipal water grid. Dry Toilet is one of a series of community-focused on-site projects by Potrč that are characterized by participatory design and a concern with sustainability issues, particularly in relation to energy and water infrastructures. Other important projects are Balcony with Wind Turbine (Liverpool, 2004), Power from Nature (Barefoot College, Rajasthan, India, and the Catherine Ferguson Academy, Detroit, Mich., USA, 2005), and A Farm in Murcia: Rainwater Harvesting (Murcia, Spain, 2007). In Potrč's view, the sustainable solutions that are implemented and disseminated by communities serve to empower these communities and help create a democracy built from below.

Since 2011, Marjetica Potrč has been a professor at the University of Fine Arts/HFBK in Hamburg, Germany, where she teaches the course Design for the Living World. She and her students have carried out participatory design projects in various parts of Europe (Germany, Austria, Norway, Sweden, and Serbia), as well as in the United States and South Africa. The Soweto Project (2014) is of particular note. She and her class spent two months in the Soweto district in Johannesburg, where, among other things, they worked with the residents of the Orlando East neighborhood to turn a degraded public space, which was being used as a dumping ground, into a community park.

Since 2010, Potrč has also made a number of projects with the architectural and design practice Ooze (Eva Pfannes and Sylvain Hartenberg), based in Rotterdam. These projects, which focus largely on water purification, include Between the Waters: The Emscher Community Garden in Essen, Germany (2010), where they constructed a complete sustainable water supply system on an island in the Emscher River, and Of Soil and Water: King's Cross Pond Club, in London (2015), where they created a natural swimming pond with its own micro-ecological environment on a construction site.

Potrč's large gallery installations, which she calls "architectural case studies," are a unique practice and have long been a central part of her work; they aim to translate into the gallery space her view of contemporary architectural practices and their relationship to issues of energy, water use, and communication. For example, soon after the Dry Toilet project, she created Hybrid House: Caracas, West Bank, West Palm Beach at the Palm Beach Institute of Contemporary Art in Lake Worth, Florida, in 2003 (the following year, the installation traveled to the List Visual Arts Center of the Massachusetts Institute of Technology, Cambridge, Massachusetts). The installation represents a case study of three contemporary communities in conflict—the Caracas barrio, the West Bank, and West Palm Beach, Florida—and illustrates how they negotiate issues of space, security, energy, water, and communications, bringing to the fore the uneasy coexistence of different communities in 21st-century societies. In one of her most controversial and most often quoted statements, Potrč has observed: "There are two urban forms in the global city that I consider to be most successful—after all, they are growing the fastest—namely, gated communities and shantytowns."

Beginning with her six-month-long research in Caracas in 2003, Potrč's practice has been distinguished by extended research projects in regions that are reinventing themselves after the decline of 20th-century modernism. Most significant have been her projects in the Amazonian state of Acre in western Brazil in 2006 (in conjunction with the São Paulo Art Biennial); the Lost Highway Expedition in nine cities in the Western Balkans (Ljubljana, Zagreb, Novi Sad, Belgrade, Skopje, Pristina, Tirana, Podgorica, and Sarajevo), which she co-organized in collaboration with School of Missing Studies and a group of artists and architects; and her research project on water issues in post-Katrina New Orleans, in which she collaborated with the design consultancy FutureProof in 2007-2008. Collaboration with local individuals, groups, and organizations is a significant aspect of nearly all her research projects.

These research projects provide the basis for later drawing series and architectural case studies, which translate her findings to wider audiences. Potrč constructs her drawings as narratives that present and interpret with simple images and text the challenges and strategies of the communities she has studied. Her drawing series include, among others, The Struggle for  Justice (2005), Florestania (2006), and The Great Republic of New Orleans (2007).

Exhibitions and awards
Potrč's work has been exhibited extensively throughout Europe and the Americas, including in such important international shows as the São Paulo Biennial (1996 and 2006), and the Venice Biennial (in the exhibitions The Structure of Survival, 2003, and "Making Worlds", 2009). She also participated in the 5th Gwangju Biennale in Gwangju, South Korea (2004). She has shown her work regularly at the Nordenhake Gallery in Berlin and Stockholm since 2003, and, formerly, at the Max Protetch Gallery (2002–2009) and the Meulensteen Gallery (2009–2012) in New York. She has also had solo exhibitions at the Guggenheim Museum in New York (2001), the List Visual Arts Center at the Massachusetts Institute of Technology (2004), the Portikus in Frankfurt am Main (2006), and the Curve at the Barbican Art Gallery in London (2007), among others. Other important exhibitions of her work include Caracas: Growing Houses, which she presented as part of the exhibition Architektonika 2 at the Hamburger Bahnhof – Museum for Contemporary Art in Berlin (2012) and The School of the Forest: Miami Campus at the Pérez Art Museum in Miami, FL (2015); in both exhibitions, she revisits and recontextualizes issues she explored in earlier research projects in Caracas and the Amazonian state of Acre, in Brazil.

In 2018, Marjetica Potrč was one of the artists presented in the group exhibition Eco-Visionaries at Bildmuseet, Umeå University, Sweden.

Potrč has received numerous grants and awards, including two grants from the Pollock-Krasner Foundation (1993 and 1999); the Hugo Boss Prize in 2000, administered by the Guggenheim Museum (2000); and the Vera List Center for Arts and Politics Fellowship at The New School in New York (2007).

Selected bibliography

Exhibition catalogues
 Marjetica Potrč: Urgent Architecture (2003). Edited by Michael Rush with essays by Carlos Basualdo, Liyat Esakov, Marjetica Potrč, Michael Rush, and Eyal Weizman. Lake Worth, Fla.: Palm Beach Institute of Contemporary Art. Distributed by DAP (http://artbook.com).
 Marjetica Potrč: Next Stop, Kiosk (2003). Edited by Lívia Páldi with essays by Zdenka Badovinac, Hans Ulrich Obrist, Lívia Páldi, Marjetica Potrč, and Goran Tomčić. Ljubljana: Moderna galerija. Distributed by Revolver Archiv für aktuelle Kunst (https://web.archive.org/web/20170523160102/http://revolverlag.de/).
 Marjetica Potrč: Urban Negotiation (2003). Edited by Ana Maria Torres with essays by Kosme de Baranano, Ana Maria Torres, Marjetica Potrč, Max Protetch, and Francesco Careri. Valencia, Spain: Instituto Valenciano de Arte Moderno (IVAM). Distributed by Aldeasa, Madrid  (e-mail: distribucion-editorial@aldeasa.es).
 Marjetica Potrč: Florestania (2009). Hanover, NH: Dartmouth College.

Articles and reviews
 Blake Gopnik, "The Ten Most Important Artists of Today", Newsweek, 13&20 June 2011.
 Joshua Decter, "Marjetica Potrc at Max Protetch Gallery," Artforum International, April 2008, 371–372.
 Jennifer Higgie, "Form Follows Function," Frieze, May 2006, 136–141.
 Marco Scotini, "Dry Toilet," Domus, no. 891, "Geo-Design" (April 2006): 88–91.
 Carlos Basualdo and Reinaldo Laddaga, "Rules of Engagement," Artforum International, March 2004, 166–170.
 Eleanor Heartney, "A House of Parts," Art in America, May 2004, 140–143.
 Jan Verwoert, "Confessions of a Global Urbanist," Afterall, no. 9 (2004): 47–54.
 Emily Bowles, "Marjetica Potrc at Max Protetch – New York," Art in America, January 2003, 105.

References

External links
 Marjetica Potrč's website
 Design for the Living World
 Nordenhake Gallery
 Hugo Boss Prize 2000
 Video of Talk with Marjetica Potrč and Carlos Basualdo at The New School, Nov. 1, 2007 
 Marjetica Potrč, "A Vision of the Future City and the Artist's Role as Mediator", talk at the Harvard Graduate School of Design, 2012

Artists from Ljubljana
1953 births
Living people
University of Ljubljana alumni
Slovenian women architects
Jakopič Award laureates
Architects from Ljubljana
Slovenian women artists
Slovenian contemporary artists